Mordellistena lecontei is a beetle in the genus Mordellistena of the family Mordellidae. It was described in 1954 by Ermisch.

References

lecontei
Beetles described in 1954